Donald Mackinnon  (30 April 18922 May 1965) was an Australian public servant and diplomat.

References

1892 births
1965 deaths
Ambassadors of Australia to Brazil
Australian Commanders of the Order of the British Empire
20th-century Australian public servants
People from Prahran, Victoria
Public servants from Melbourne